Charles John Smythe (21 April 1852 – May 1918) was prime minister of the Colony of Natal from 1905 to 1906.

He was the grandfather of Victoria Cross winner Quentin Smythe.

References 

 https://northernnatalnews.co.za/153615/looking-back-in-time-2/
 https://www.ukwhoswho.com/view/10.1093/ww/9780199540891.001.0001/ww-9780199540884-e-203135

1852 births
1918 deaths
Colony of Natal people
Scottish emigrants to South Africa
People educated at Glenalmond College
Justices of the peace